Broadstone (Somerset) railway station was a very small halt on the Weston, Clevedon and Portishead Light Railway which operated in Somerset between 1918 and 1940.

History
The station was opened in 1918. It was located on a level crossing, a mile from the village of Kingston Seymour. It had no built platforms, and possessed only a very small wooden shelter, not much larger than a telephone booth. Despite its small proportions, the suffix 'halt' was not used.

Broadstone closed along with the railway in 1940.

Present Day
The site of the station was not visible to the casual observer for many years. The WC&P Railway Group has erected a replica of the wooden shelter at the location.

References

Railway stations in Great Britain opened in 1918
Railway stations in Great Britain closed in 1940
Disused railway stations in Somerset